Lawrence "Larry" Leichliter  is an American animator and director who began his work in animation in 1975 with the made-for-TV Peanuts special You're a Good Sport, Charlie Brown. Throughout his career, he has worked on Peanuts animated television films, but he has also contributed to other successful animated series including Nickelodeon's ChalkZone and The Mighty B! and Cartoon Network's Time Squad, Squirrel Boy, The Marvelous Misadventures of Flapjack, Sym-Bionic Titan, and Adventure Time.

Career
Leichliter's career in animation began in 1975 when he worked on You're a Good Sport, Charlie Brown. This was followed by numerous other Peanuts specials that he was a crew member of throughout the late 1970s and 1980s. Since then, he has worked on many animated television series, particularly those made for Nickelodeon, which include Hey Arnold!, ChalkZone, SpongeBob SquarePants, CatDog, The Fairly OddParents, The Mighty B!, and Catscratch. Leichliter more recently was a director for the Cartoon Network original series Adventure Time, for which he directed 114 episodes and the original short. Adventure Time also garnered him three Primetime Emmy Award nominations in the category "Outstanding Short-Format Animated Program" in 2010, 2011, and 2012. He is currently directing Bee and PuppyCat for Cartoon Hangover. In 2015, he received a Primetime Emmy Award for his work as animation director on Over the Garden Wall.

Filmography

References

External links
 

American animators
American television directors
American animated film directors
California Institute of the Arts alumni
Living people
Cartoon Network Studios people
Nickelodeon Animation Studio people
Sullivan Bluth Studios people
Year of birth missing (living people)